Al-Haith is a sub-district located in Ba'dan District, Ibb Governorate, Yemen. Al-Haith had a population of 6699 as of 2004.

References 

Sub-districts in Ba'dan District